Vadivukku Valai Kappu is a 1962 Indian Tamil-language film written and directed by A. P. Nagarajan in his directorial debut. The film stars Sivaji Ganesan, Savitri, V. K. Ramasamy, M. N. Rajam, S. V. Subbaiah, S. Varalakshmi and T. P. Muthulakshmi. It was released on 7 July 1962.

Plot

Cast 
 Sivaji Ganesan as Kumara Vijaya Boopathy
 Savitri as Vadivu
 Sowcar Janaki
 M. N. Rajam as Rajeswari
 V. K. Ramasamy as Mahendra Boopathy
 S. V. Subbaiah as Subban
 S. Varalakshmi as Nachiyar
 Kuladeivam Rajagopal as Nallan
 T. P. Muthulakshmi as Manthahini
 T. K. Ramachandran as Thalapathy
 Manorama

Production 
Vadivukku Valai Kappu marked the directorial debut of A. P. Nagarajan, who worked mostly as a screenwriter at that time. He and V. K. Ramasamy (who acted in the film) produced the film, under the banner Sri Lakshmi Pictures. K. Somu was the original director, but removed his name from the credits in favour of Nagarajan. A. Gopinath and N. A. Thara handled the cinematography, while T. R. Nataraj did the editing. Sampath-Chinni, Rajkumar, Thangaraj and Krishnaraj were in charge of choreography. A. M. Shahul Hameed provided Nagarajan financial support to complete the film, but was not credited as producer. The final length was 15642 feet.

Soundtrack 
The music of the film was composed by K. V. Mahadevan and the lyrics were penned by Kannadasan, A. Maruthakasi and A. S. Narayanan.

Release and reception 
Vadivukku Valai Kappu was released on 7 July 1962, after being delayed for over four years. The Illustrated Weekly of India stated, "The story is poor and the way in which it is told is even poorer." Kanthan of Kalki also printed a negative review, saying there was no redeemable feature except for the outdoor photography.

References

External links 
 

1962 directorial debut films
1962 drama films
1962 films
Films directed by A. P. Nagarajan
Films scored by K. V. Mahadevan
Films with screenplays by A. P. Nagarajan
Indian drama films
1960s Tamil-language films